Sir Andrew Judde, or Judd (5 September 1492 – 1558) was a 16th-century English merchant and Lord Mayor of London. He was knighted on 15 February 1551.

Biography
He was born in Tonbridge, the third son of John Judde, (d. 1493), gentleman, and Margaret, daughter of Valentine Chiche. His mother was the granddaughter of an earlier Lord Mayor of London, Robert Chichele, and great-niece of Henry Chichele, Archbishop of Canterbury, and William Chichele, Sheriff of London. He left for London and apprenticed with the Skinners Company; he was later the master of the company for four terms. He accumulated a large fortune, part of which he used to establish  Tonbridge School in his home town. During his career as a merchant, he personally travelled to Russia, Spain, and the coast of Africa. He served as one of the Sheriffs of London in 1544, and was elected Lord Mayor of London in 1550. As a result of his vigorous opposition to Wyatt's Rebellion, he gained the favour of Queen Mary and Philip II of Spain. He served as Mayor of the Staple of Calais.

Family
Sir Andrew Judde was married three times.
 He married first, by 1523, Mary (d. 1542), daughter of Thomas Murfyn (d. 1523), an earlier Lord Mayor of London, and his first wife, Alice Marshall. By her he had four sons, two of whom survived, and a daughter:
 John Judd
 Richard Judd
 Alice Judd, who married Thomas Smythe (1522–1591), collector of customs for London.
(His first wife's stepsister, Frances Murfyn (–), married, in 1534, Thomas Cromwell's nephew, Richard. Alice Squire (d. 1560), the widow of her brother, Edward Murfyn, married circa 1528, Edward North (later Baron North).)

 He married a second time, in 1542, to Agnes (Annys), about whom nothing is known.
 His third and final marriage was in 1552 to Mary (died 1602), the wealthy widow of another skinner, Thomas Langton, and daughter of Thomas Mathews of Colchester. By his last wife, he had a daughter:
 Martha Judd, who married Robert Golding in Essex.

Death
Judde died on 4 September 1558 and was buried in St Helen's, Bishopsgate, London.

References

Bibliography

External links
 Tonbridge School, History
 Sir Andrew Judde
 

Sheriffs of the City of London
16th-century lord mayors of London
Merchants of the Staple
Knights Bachelor
1492 births
1558 deaths